Cheonggyesa (Hangul: 청계사; Hanja: 淸溪寺) is a temple of the Jogye Order of Korean Buddhism in Uiwang, Cheonggyesan (Seoul/Gyeonggi). The temple was first built in Silla Kingdom era.

Transportation
Cheonggyesa is located 11 Cheonggye-dong, Uiwang-si, Gyeonggi Province. The nearest subway station is
Indeogwon Station (Station #440 on Line 4). From the Indeogwon Station, it takes around 10 minutes to the temple by a taxi.

Temple Stay 
Cheonggyesa also offers Temple Stay programs where visitors can experience Buddhist culture.

Gallery

See also
Cheonggyesan (Seoul/Gyeonggi)
Korean Buddhist temples
Korean Buddhism
Gyeongheo

External links
 Official homepage

Buddhist temples in South Korea